Absence is the third album by alternative hip hop group dälek, released by Ipecac Recordings in 2005. The album, according to the group, was recorded during a very dark and pessimistic time period for the group, which in turn resulted in the recording's dark, bleak sound.

Track listing

Reception 

Upon its initial release in 2005, Absence received praise from many publications. Critics praised the album for its brooding sound and thought provoking lyrics. Treble magazine included the album in its list of '10 Essential Industrial Hip Hop Albums'. Drowned in Sound magazine ranked the album at #53 on their "DiS is 6: Our 66" list, published in 2006 (which covers its favorite albums from the six years since its creation). Italian underground music magazine OndaRock also rated the album the 26th best of the decade.

Personnel 
Dalek
 Dälek – lead vocals, writing and production
 Oktopus – production and writing
 Still – turntables, producer

Additional musicians
Oddateee – additional vocals on "Culture for Dollars"

Other personnel
Joshua Booth – writing and mixing
Will Brooks – engineering, mixing and layout design
Marco Burbano – "absence" tag
Jesse Cannon – mixing
Alan Douches – mastering
Hsi-Chang Lin – layout design
Alex Lyach – photography
Mike Mare – photography
Alan Momin – engineering and mixing
Scott Shields – layout design

References

Ipecac Recordings albums
2005 albums
Dälek albums